Vasek Pospisil was the defending champion, but decided not participate this year.

Marcos Baghdatis won the title, defeating Farrukh Dustov 7–6(8–6), 6–3 in the final.

Seeds

Draw

Finals

Top half

Bottom half

References 
 Main Draw
 Qualifying Draw

Odlum Brown Vancouver
Vancouver Open